Smt. Sulochanadevi Singhania School is a high school in Jekegram, Thane, India, close to the city of Mumbai.

The school was founded in 1968 by Gopalkrishna Singhania and named after his wife. The school started operating in 1969 and has expanded from 400 students then to more than 6500 now, under principals Dr S.R.N. Rao, Dr M.D. Jani, Dr Vijayam Ravi and Mrs Revathi Srinivasan.
 

The school is affiliated to the Council for the Indian School Certificate Examinations (CISCE) which conducts its Indian Certificate of Secondary Education (ICSE) examinations for Class 10 and Indian School Certificate (ISC) examinations for Class 11 and 12 and the International Baccalaureate, which conducts its International Baccalaureate Diploma Programme (IBDP) examinations for Class 11 and 12.

Achievements
Awarded the prestigious INTERNATIONAL SCHOOL AWARD by British Council for 5 times in a row.
In 2020, The school was ranked as the best Co-educational day school in Maharashtra and 5th in India by Education World.

2019 ICSE Results
Mas. Yash Jitendra Bhansali topped with 99.40% and secured All India Merit Rank No. 2.
Mas. Aditya Pravin Wakchoure and Mas. Ojas Deshpande scored 99.20% and jointly stood Second in the school and secured All India Merit Rank No. 3

2016 ICSE Results
School average : 91%
492 students took the examinations and 67% of them scored 90% or over.
 
The number of students who scored 100%:
Mathematics – 20
Science – 4
Home science 5
Commercial applications – 14
Technical drawing – 4
Computer applications – 88

This was also the year school gained national recognition due to Priyanka Bagade, a student of class 10th who secured All India Rank 3 in the ICSE exam.

The school was ranked Mumbai's No. 1 day co-educational school by the Hindustan Times Top School Survey 2015

The school was ranked the country's No. 1, the state's No. 1 and Mumbai's No. 1 day co-educational school in the Education World India school rankings 2015 for its efforts towards an holistic approach to education, based on a survey conducted by C-fore for Education World.

References

High schools and secondary schools in Maharashtra
Schools in Thane district
Educational institutions established in 1968
1968 establishments in Maharashtra